

Sauropterygia

Newly named plesiosaurs

Synapsids

Non-mammalian

References